Torbit.com (Founded in November 2010) was a San Mateo, cloud based website acceleration service. Torbit drew attention from TechCrunch and other publications for their web optimization service. The service is billed as being the first in the industry to offer insights which allow companies to track the real time performance of their websites.

Insight
According to TechCrunch, the Torbit solution gives users access to real time URL data, including a map based system displaying user load times, and key metrics which allow a company to pinpoint the least optimized URL's on their site. TechCrunch indicated the product is a potential competitor for Cloudflare, although Torbit founder and CEO is quoted in the article, claiming it to be a complementary service.

As of November 2012 - TechCrunch had reported over 1,000 leading sites had installed Torbit's scripts as part of their web optimization strategy.

John Titlow of Read Write, opined that the company's product would be popular now that load times are a factor in Google page rankings.

Acquisition

On July 24, 2013, Walmart Labs (the tech division of Walmart, Inc.), announced the acquisition of Torbit  in order to improve Walmart.com and help the retailer in its competition with Amazon.

References

External links
 Torbit Company Site

Information technology companies of the United States
Companies based in San Mateo, California
American companies established in 2010
2010 establishments in California